Caloptilia iselaea is a moth of the family Gracillariidae. It is known from Brunei, the Cook Islands, Fiji, India, Indonesia (Java and Sulawesi), Malaysia (Pahang and Selangor), Sri Lanka and Thailand.

The larvae feed on Spondias cytherea, Spondias mangifera and Spondias pinnata. They mine the leaves of their host plant.

References

iselaea
Moths of Asia
Moths described in 1914